Chlewo  is a village in the administrative district of Gmina Grabów nad Prosną, within Ostrzeszów County, Greater Poland Voivodeship, in west-central Poland.

The village has a population of 364.

References

Chlewo